Vocca is a comune (municipality) in the Province of Vercelli in the Italian region Piedmont, located about  northeast of Turin and about  northwest of Vercelli.

Vocca borders the following municipalities: Balmuccia, Borgosesia, Cravagliana, Postua, Scopa, and Varallo Sesia.

References

Cities and towns in Piedmont